Capitán Av. Selin Zeitun Lopez Airport  is an airport serving Riberalta, a port city on the Beni River in the Beni Department of Bolivia. The airport is in the western section of the city, near the confluence of the Beni and Madre de Dios Rivers.

The Riberalta non-directional beacon (Ident: REA) is located on the field.

Airlines and destinations

See also

Transport in Bolivia
List of airports in Bolivia

References

External links
Riberalta Airport at OpenStreetMap
Riberalta Airport at OurAirports

Cap. Av. Selin Zeitun Lopez Airport at FallingRain

Airports in Beni Department